Russell Raymond Veh (real name unknown) (born 1950) was the head of the San Diego based neo-Nazi organization World Service. From the early 1970s through the 1990s, Veh edited and distributed neo-Nazi and racist propaganda books, periodicals, and films around the world by mail. By 1990, he was "one of the largest purveyors of white supremacist information in the country." Veh also served as leader of the gay neo-Nazi National Socialist League from 1974 until its disappearance in 1984.

Biography
Veh was a native of Toledo, Ohio and founded the Ohio Nationalist Party in 1970, renamed the American White Nationalist Party in 1971. The organization was short-lived, however, and he moved to California in 1974.

In California, Veh led the National Socialist League (NSL), a gay neo-Nazi organization. He managed to get the party advertised in the historically gay Bay Area Reporter newspaper and the gay leather magazine Drummer. Veh and his party distributed membership applications declaring NSL's "determination to seek sexual, social, and political freedom" for Aryans. The literature printed by Veh's organization often featured provocative images of scantily clad SS soldiers with swastikas covering their genitals to emphasize the "sexual trip" described by the recruiting pitch.

The National Socialist League disappeared in 1984. Veh continued to operate the World Service into the 1990s, converting the NSL periodical NS Mobilizer and its subscription list into a non-sexuality-based propaganda outlet, Race & Nation (renamed Jew Watch after 1990).

See also
National Socialist League (United States)
Michael Kühnen

References

American LGBT rights activists
American neo-Nazis
Leaders of political parties in the United States
People from Toledo, Ohio
People from Los Angeles
Living people
1950 births
American political party founders
Unidentified people